The  is a national expressway in Hiroshima Prefecture, Japan. It is owned and operated by West Nippon Expressway Company.

Naming
The expressway is officially referred to as the Chūgoku-Ōdan Expressway Hiroshima Hamada Route. The Chūgoku-Ōdan Expressway Hiroshima Hamada Route is the official designation for the Sanyō Expressway between Hiroshima Interchange and Hiroshima Junction, the Hiroshima Expressway between Hiroshima Junction and Hiroshima-kita Junction, the Chūgoku Expressway between Hiroshima-kita Junction and Chiyoda Junction, and the Hamada Expressway between Chiyoda Junction and Hamada Interchange (concurrent with the Chūgoku-Ōdan Expressway Hiroshima Hamada Route).

Overview
The expressway is a short connector route linking Chūgoku Expressway with the Sanyō Expressway.

Although the route officially originates at Hiroshima Junction, the southern terminus and terminates at Hiroshima-kita Junction, the northern terminus, exit numbers and kilometer markings originate from Hiroshima-kita Junction.

List of interchanges and features

 IC - interchange, SIC - smart interchange, JCT - junction, SA - service area, PA - parking area, BS - bus stop, TN - tunnel, BR - bridge

External links 
 West Nippon Expressway Company

Expressways in Japan